Wang Jik was a Korean Royal Prince as the only son of Taejo of Goryeo and Lady Heungbok of the Hongju Hong clan. His religion was Buddhism and died without issue.

In popular culture
Portrayed by Yoon Dae-yong in the 2015 MBC TV Series Shine or Go Crazy.

References

Korean princes
Year of birth unknown
Year of death unknown
10th-century Korean people